Rhamnus libanotica is a species of flowering plant in the Rhamnaceae family. It is referred to by the common name Lebanese buckthorn, and is native to Western Asia from Lebanon and Syria to Turkey.

References

libanotica
Flora of Lebanon
Flora of Syria
Flora of Turkey
Taxa named by Pierre Edmond Boissier